The World Peace & Liberty Award is a recognition granted since 1965 by the World Jurist Association, recognizing outstanding world personalities for their role in the defense of the Rule of Law in opposition to the use of force.

History and development 
The award is intrinsically linked to the history of the World Jurist Association. In the early 1960s, during the Cold War years, judges, lawyers, law professors and other legal professionals were demanding the organization of an open and free forum to work strengthening and disseminating the importance of the Rule of Law and its institutions around the world. In 1963, the World peace Through Law Center of the American Bar Association (today World Jurist Association), with the initial encouragement of Winston Churchill, Earl Warren and Charles Rhyne, President of the American Bar Association. Following its creation, the organization first awarded the World Peace & Liberty Award in 1965 to Sir Winston Churchill. 

The next recipients of the award were René Cassin, main drafter of the Universal Declaration of Human Rights, in 1972; and Nelson Mandela, who received it in 1997, during the World Jurist Association Conference celebrated in Cape Town.  

In 2019, the prize was awarded to King Felipe VI of Spain for his role in defending the Rule of Law in the face of the Catalan independence challenge. It was presented during the closing ceremony of the World Law Congress Madrid.  

Ruth Bader Ginsburg, Associate Justice of the US Supreme Court Justice, was awarded in 2020 for her defense of gender equality and civil rights. The ceremony was held at the headquarters of the American Bar Association in Washington, D.C.In 2021 the Colombian Society, received in hands of its then President Iván Duque Márquez on the 30th anniversary of its democratic constitution.

Recipients 
 Winston Churchill, 1965
 Rene Cassin, 1972
 Nelson Mandela, 1997
 Felipe VI of Spain, 2019
 Ruth Bader Ginsburg, 2020
 The Colombian Society, 2021

References

Related links 
 World Jurist Association
 World Law Foundation

Legal awards